Gustavo Falciroli (born 13 December 1982) is an Australian-Brazilian mixed martial artist. Brazilian-born Gustavo has lived in Australia since 2007 and is an Australian citizen. Gustavo Falciroli is the reigning Cage Fighting Championship and Australian Fighting Championship bantamweight champions, one of the most decorated mixed martial arts fighters in Australia and a Brazilian jiu-jitsu black belt fourth degree.

Brazilian jiu-jitsu
Gustavo started his training in 1996 with Brazilian Jiu-Jitsu with Paulo Roberto de Miranda Streckert and has also trained with Carlos Alberto Liberi, in 2003 he was awarded his black belt by Roberto Tozi and Roberto Godoi. After placing third at the BJJ World Championships, winning the Brazilian Cup and taking home a slew of state titles in Brazil—all as a black belt—in 2007 he made the move to Australia and the transition into MMA. Since entering the world of mixed martial arts, Gustavo has replicated the success he found in BJJ and is renowned for his ability to apply his grappling and submissions in MMA.

Mixed martial arts career
Gustavo made his mixed martial arts debut at Shooto Australia in Perth in May, 2007.
Gustavo defeated Richie Vaculik for the inaugural Cage Fighting Championships (CFC) bantamweight title at CFC 12, December 2010, via unanimous decision (5 rounds). He defended for the first time on 9 December 2011, winning by submission against Nick Honstein at Cage Fighting Championship 19. In February 2012 Gustavo attended at ONE Fighting Championship: Battle of Heroes, Jakarta to be the first ever Australian to fight in the Asian show. He submitted Soo Chul Kim via rear naked choke on the first round to become victorious.
In August 2012 Gustavo contended in a main event ONE Fighting Championship at ONE Fighting Championship: Pride of a Nation, Philippines. He was defeated by Bibiano Fernandes via unanimous decision.
Gustavo is the inaugural Australian Fighting Championship (AFC) bantamweight title holder after defeating New Zealander Kai Kara-France at AFC 9, via submission in round 1 in May 2014. The title fight was a rematch from AFC 7 after France fell out of the ring after being knocked out and struck a ringside table, a controversial No Contest was adjudicated by officials.

Achievements

Mixed martial arts
Cage Fighting Championship
CFC Bantamweight Championship (Two times)
Australian Fighting Championship
AFC Bantamweight Championship (One time; current)
K-Oz Entertainment
K-Oz Entertainment Bantamweight Championship (One time; current)
Xtreme Fighting Championship
XFC Xtreme Fighting Bantamweight Championship (One time; current)

Main titles
Black Belt
2011 – Gold – Pan Pacific Championship (Melbourne, Australia)
2011 – Gold – Australian Cup (Perth, Australia)
2006 – Gold – Sao Paulo State Championship (Sao Paulo, Brazil)
2006 – Silver – South American Championship ( Florianópolis, Brazil)
2006 – Silver – Brazilian Cup (Rio de Janeiro, Brazil)
2005 – Gold – King of the Grappler (Seoul, South Korea)
2004 – Bronze – World Championships (Rio de Janeiro, Brazil)
2004 – Gold – Brazilian South Cup (Porto Alegre, Brazil)
2004 – Gold -Brazilian Cup (Rio de Janeiro, Brazil)
2004 – Gold -Sao Paulo State Championship (Sao Paulo, Brazil)
Brown Belt
2003 – Gold – World Cup (Rio de Janeiro, Brazil)
2003 – Gold – Brazilian Championship (Rio de Janeiro, Brazil)
2003 – Gold – Sao Paulo State Championship (Sao Paulo, Brazil)
Purple Belt
2001 – Bronze – Pan-American Championship (Orlando, USA)
2000 – Gold – Sao Paulo State Championship (Sao Paulo, Brazil)
2000 – Bronze – Pan-American Championship (Orlando, USA)
Blue Belt
1999 – Gold – Brazilian Championship (Rio de Janeiro, Brazil)
1999 – Bronze – World Championship (Rio de Janeiro, Brazil)
1999 – Gold – Sao Paulo State Championship (Sao Paulo, Brazil)

Personal life
Gustavo immigrated to Australia and has lived in Perth in Western Australia but has since relocated to Melbourne. In December 2012, Falciroli was subject to xenophobia on Melbourne public transport. After hearing him speak in Portuguese, a man approached Falciroli and told him that this was "not his country". He threatened to "cut" and "rape" him, his wife, and his two children. Falciroli got off the train and called the police. "Despite it [being] a bad situation, once again life has showed me that violence just creates more violence and I never should use my skills outside a cage, a ring or a mat," Falciroli said on social media.

Mixed martial arts record

|-
|Loss
|align=center| 17–6–2 (1)
|Alan Philpott
|Decision (unanimous)
|ACB 88: Barnatt vs. Celiński
|
|align=center|3
|align=center|5:00
|Brisbane, Australia
|
|-
| Win
| align=center| 17–5–2 (1)
| Julian Wallace 
| Submission (Triangle-Choke)
| XFC 27 
| 
| align=center| 2
| align=center| 4:47
| Mansfield, Australia
|
|-
| Loss
| align=center| 16–5–2 (1)
| Darwin Sagurit
| TKO (punch)
| Minotaur 3: Carnage
| 
| align=center| 1
| align=center| N/A
| Parkville, Victoria, Australia
|
|-
| Win
| align=center| 16–4–2 (1)
| Hikaru Hasumi
| Submission (armbar)
| HFS – Hex Fight Series 4
| 
| align=center| 1
| align=center| 4:40
| Melbourne, Australia
|
|-
| Win
| align=center| 15–4–2 (1)
| Mohd Fouzein Mohd Fozi
| Submission (D'arce Choke)
| K-Oz Entertainment – Bragging Rights 7: Resurrection
| 
| align=center| 1
| align=center| 1:13
| Perth, Australia
| 
|-
|-
| Win
| align=center| 14–4–2 (1)
| Kai Kara-France
| Submission (D'arce Choke)
| Australian Fighting Championship 9
| 
| align=center| 1
| align=center| 4:55
| Albury, Australia
| 
|-
| NC
| align=center| 13–4–2 (1)
| Kai Kara-France
| No Contest
| Australian Fighting Championship 7
| 
| align=center| 2
| align=center| 3:20
| Melbourne, Australia
| 
|-
| Loss
| align=center| 13–4–2
| Bibiano Fernandes
| Decision (unanimous)
| ONE FC: Pride of a Nation
| 
| align=center| 3
| align=center| 5:00
| Manila, Philippines
| 
|-
| Win
| align=center| 13–3–2
| Soo Chul Kim
| Submission (rear-naked choke)
| ONE FC: Battle of Heroes
| 
| align=center| 1
| align=center| 1:12
| Jakarta, Indonesia
| 
|-
| Win
| align=center| 12–3–2
| Nick Honstein
| Submission (arm triangle choke)
| Cage Fighting Championship 19
| 
| align=center| 2
| align=center| 3:14
| Sydney, Australia
| 
|-
| Loss
| align=center| 11–3–2
| Taiki Tsuchiya
| Decision (unanimous)
| Shooto: The Way of Shooto 6: Like a Tiger, Like a Dragon
| 
| align=center| 3
| align=center| 5:00
| Tokyo, Japan
| 
|-
| Win
| align=center| 11–2–2
| Hideki Kadowaki
| KO (punches)
| Shooto Australia – Superfight Australia 8
| 
| align=center| 1
| align=center| 1:53
| Joondalup, Australia
| 
|-
| Win
| align=center| 10–2–2
| Richie Vaculik
| Decision (unanimous)
| Cage Fighting Championship 12
| 
| align=center| 5
| align=center| 5:00
| Sydney, Australia
| 
|-
| Loss
| align=center| 9–2–2
| Issei Tamura
| Decision (unanimous)
| Shooto: Revolutionary Exchanges 3
| 
| align=center| 3
| align=center| 5:00
| Tokyo, Japan
| 
|-
| Win
| align=center| 9–1–2
| Daisuke Ishizawa
| Submission (triangle armbar)
| Shooto: Revolutionary Exchanges 2
| 
| align=center| 1
| align=center| 4:55
| Tokyo, Japan
| 
|-
| Win
| align=center| 8–1–2
| Akiyo Nishiura
| Decision (majority)
| Shooto Australia – Superfight Australia 6
| 
| align=center| 3
| align=center| 5:00
| Joondalup, Australia
| 
|-
| Win
| align=center| 7–1–2
| Masahiro Oishi
| TKO (punches)
| Rize 1 – Rize MMA
| 
| align=center| 2
| align=center| 2:02
| Queensland, Australia
| 
|-
| Win
| align=center| 6–1–2
| Kazuhiro Ito
| Decision (unanimous)
| Shooto Australia – Superfight Australia 5
| 
| align=center| 3
| align=center| 5:00
| Joondalup, Australia
| 
|-
| Win
| align=center| 5–1–2
| Taro Kusano
| KO (punch)
| Shooto Australia – Superfight Australia 4
| 
| align=center| 1
| align=center| 0:53
| Perth, Australia
| 
|-
| Win
| align=center| 4–1–2
| Ryan Mortimer
| Submission (armbar)
| WR 13 – Warriors Realm 13
| 
| align=center| 1
| align=center| 2:46
| Southport, Australia
| 
|-
| Draw
| align=center| 3–1–2
| Takumi Ota
| Draw
| Shooto Australia – Superfight Australia 3
| 
| align=center| 2
| align=center| 5:00
| Perth, Australia
| 
|-
| Loss
| align=center| 3–1–1
| Bernardo Magalhaes
| Decision (majority)
| CFC – Cage Fighting Championships 3
| 
| align=center| 3
| align=center| 5:00
| Sydney, Australia
| 
|-
| Win
| align=center| 3–0–1
| Michiyuki Ishibashi
| Submission (rear-naked choke)
| Shooto Australia – Superfight Australia 2 
| 
| align=center| 1
| align=center| NA
| Perth, Australia
| 
|-
| Draw
| align=center| 2–0–1
| Jai Bradney
| Draw
| IC 2 – Inspirit Challenge 2
| 
| align=center| 2
| align=center| 5:00
| Australia
| 
|-
| Win
| align=center| 2–0
| Sergio Cabral
| Decision (Unanimous)
| MMAB – MMA Boxing
| 
| align=center| 2
| align=center| 5:00
| Perth, Australia
| 
|-
| Win
| align=center| 1–0
| Mark Oates
| Submission (armbar)
| Shooto Australia – Superfight Australia 1
| 
| align=center| 1
| align=center| 1:10
| Perth, Australia
|

References

External links
 

Living people
Australian male mixed martial artists
Brazilian male mixed martial artists
Bantamweight mixed martial artists
Brazilian people of Italian descent
Brazilian emigrants to Australia
Australian practitioners of Brazilian jiu-jitsu
Brazilian practitioners of Brazilian jiu-jitsu
People awarded a black belt in Brazilian jiu-jitsu
1982 births
Mixed martial artists utilizing Brazilian jiu-jitsu
Sportspeople from São Paulo